The Sri Lanka Railways Class W1 is a class of Sri Lankan diesel hydraulic locomotive that was built by Rheinstahl Henschel in 1969. A total of 45 W1s were built and imported. This is the first diesel-hydraulic locomotive which ran on Sri Lankan rail.

Origins
The history of W1 begins in 1969. 45 of W1s were imported to Sri Lanka which made W1 the most numerous class of SLR locomotives that time. At that time only Class M1 and Class M2 locomotives were in operation. Most of other services were carried out by steam locomotives. But with the introduction of W1s most of steam locomotives were taken out of service and those services were taken by W1. This locomotive has used for SLR's famous Udarata Menike train for about 25 years. Also this locomotive can be operated on any of railway lines in Sri Lanka.

Decline
By 90's most of W1s were out of service all because of problems in the prime-mover and some due to serious accident damages. These condemned locomotives were scrapped.

In Service
With declination of W1s 2 locomotives (650 & 657) were fitted with new  Paxman VEGA SE/RP 160 prime movers of power 1250 HP. By 2011 only 2 of them were in running condition. Those were used in light duties. By 2012 none of W1s were in operation

Class W3

In 1997, 10 Class W1 locomotives  were extensively refurbished. SLR and Adtranz involved in this. During these refurbishment the locomotives were fitted with new power plants, power transmission systems and electronic engine control systems. As well as a full new repaint  of Blue and Silver was undertaken.

After the extensive refurbishment, the locomotives were reclassified as the W3-class.

See also

Diesel locomotives of Sri Lanka
Sri Lanka Railways W2

References

External links
 Sri Lanka Railways Info Page - Class W3
 ෴W3 දුම්රිය එන්ජිම - W1 එන්ජිමට නව බලසැපයුම් එන්ජින් සවිකර දේශීයව නිපැයූ එන්ජිම෴

W1
5 ft 6 in gauge locomotives
Railway locomotives introduced in 1969